Dov Sternberg is an American karateka.

Early life
Sternberg is from Woodmere, New York. His father, Dr. Alex Sternberg, founded the American Maccabiah Games karate team in 1977.

Karate career
Sternberg began training in karate at age five. He won a gold medal in the World Junior Championships in Budapest, Hungary. In 1998, he won the gold medal in Men's Advanced Kumite −60 in the USA National Karate-do Federation national championships. He won a silver medal in the 1999 Pan American Games in the Men's Kumite Individual −60kg.

At the World Traditional Karate Organization (WTKO) 2003 North American Karate Championship, he took second place in both Men's Black Belt Individual Kumite and Men's Individual Kata. At the 2009 Maccabiah Games Sternberg won a bronze medal in the Kumite Up To 60k, as part of the Team USA Karate Team. He won a gold medal as part of Team USA in the 2013 Maccabiah Games in Team Kata.

References

Living people
Year of birth missing (living people)
American male karateka
Sportspeople from New York (state)
People from Woodmere, New York
Competitors at the 2013 Maccabiah Games
Maccabiah Games gold medalists for the United States
Maccabiah Games bronze medalists for the United States
Pan American Games silver medalists for the United States
Pan American Games medalists in karate
Karateka at the 1999 Pan American Games
Medalists at the 1999 Pan American Games
21st-century American Jews